The Namibian Economic Freedom Fighters (NEFF) is a political party in Namibia. It was formed in June 2014. The party has close links to the South African Economic Freedom Fighters. Economically, the two parties are similar, with the NEFF describing itself as a pro-freedom, anti-capitalist and anti-imperialist movement, to be against foreign exploitation of the country's natural resources, and proposing that land and its natural resources be owned by indigenous people.

Led by former SWAPO member Epafras Mukwiilongo, the party differs from its South African relative in its anti-homosexual rhetoric, with Mukwiilongo stating that "Today, the imperialists are manipulating/influencing our nation through homosexual practices. The NEFF is committed to uniting all Namibians to root out this evil practice. Namibia will never be ruled by homosexuals".

The party contested the 2014 general elections. It only gathered 0.36% of the votes and failed to gain any seats in the National Assembly. Its presidential candidate Mukwilongo came in last of the nine contenders. In the 2019 general election, NEFF won 1.66% of the votes and two seats in parliament, although its presidential candidate Mukwiilongo again finished last.

Electoral history

National Assembly elections

References

2014 establishments in Namibia
Economic Freedom Fighters
Organizations that oppose LGBT rights
Pan-Africanist political parties in Africa
African and Black nationalist organizations in Africa
Political parties established in 2014
Political parties in Namibia
Socialist parties in Namibia
Racism in Africa